is a private university in Okayama, Okayama, Japan. The predecessor of the school, women's school, was founded in 1904, and it was chartered as a junior college in 1953. In 1979 it became a four-year women's college. Adopting the present name in 2003, it became a co-ed college in 2004.

External links
 Official website  English available on website, "EN" ikon at top right.

Educational institutions established in 1904
Private universities and colleges in Japan
Okayama
Universities and colleges in Okayama Prefecture
1904 establishments in Japan